Hileithia densalis is a moth in the family Crambidae. It was described by Harrison Gray Dyar Jr. in 1914. It is found in Panama.

The wingspan is about 11 mm. The forewings are pale straw yellow, shaded with ochreous brown beyond the discal mark. The ground colour is irrorated (sprinkled) with patches of dark brown shading.

References

Moths described in 1914
Spilomelinae